The Full College was the main executive body of the Republic of Venice, overseeing day-to-day governance and preparing the agenda for the Venetian Senate.

Composition
As with other higher magistracies of Venice, restrictions were placed on the eligibility to the office for the : the members were elected from the Venetian Senate, served a term of six months, and could not be re-elected to the same office for three or six months thereafter.

Functions
The College met daily, under the presidency of the Doge, but with the  setting its agenda. The council read reports and dispatches, gave audience to foreign envoys, and prepared all issues to come to a vote before the Senate. On its own discretion, particularly on pressing matters of finance or foreign affairs, the College could instead send motions to be voted by the Council of Ten. 

The College had the authority to dispose of public funds to the sum of 25 gold ducats in total. It adjudicated in matters of Church benefits and patronages, the privileges of the Republic's subject cities, and the duties of the salt tax.

The power of the College rose from 1526 on, when it received the privilege of withholding from the Senate any acts it deemed as necessary to be kept secret. Along with the College also received the authority to issue decrees when the Senate was not in session, as well as to suspend decrees of the Great Council (provided that this measure was justified during the council's next session), by the 18th century the College became the most influential institution of the Republic.

References

Sources
 
 
 

Government of the Republic of Venice